Loka pri Framu is a settlement in the Municipality of Rače–Fram in northeastern Slovenia. It lies in the Pohorje Hills to the west of Fram. The area is part of the traditional region of Styria. The municipality is now included in the Drava Statistical Region.

Name
The name of the settlement was changed from Loka to Loka pri Framu in 1955.

References

External links
Loka pri Framu at Geopedia

Populated places in the Municipality of Rače-Fram